"Everybody's Going to the Country" is a single by Canadian artist Hank Smith. The song was released in 1975. It reached number one on the RPM Country Tracks chart in Canada in April 1975.

Chart performance

References

1975 singles
Hank Smith (singer) songs
1975 songs
Quality Records singles
Songs written by Dick Damron